The Morris Downtown Commercial Historic District is a historic district in downtown Morris. The district includes 116 buildings and a monument; 105 of these are commercial buildings, and 87 are contributing properties to the district.

History
The historic district reflects the history of Morris, Illinois as a canal town on the Illinois & Michigan Canal. Named after canal commissioner Isaac N. Morris, the town became the Grundy County seat in 1841 and was originally platted a year later. The earliest of the buildings were built in the 1850s, shortly after the canal's construction. Then, the Chicago, Rock Island & Pacific Railroad were completed in 1848 and 1853, respectively. Morris became an important transportation hub. Commercial development began north of the canal along Illinois (originally Canal) and Washington Streets which was home to livery, blacksmith, and harness businesses. Lyman Ray, future Lieutenant Governor of Illinois, opened the town's first dry goods store.

The district was added to the National Register of Historic Places on January 31, 2006.

Architecture
The district mainly consists of brick or sandstone commercial buildings of uniform size, and its character is considered typical of a small town business district. The buildings in the district were designed in a wide variety of architectural styles, including Commercial, Italianate, Queen Anne, Classical Revival, Renaissance Revival, and Tudor Revival. The district also contains two prominent government buildings, the Grundy County Courthouse and the Morris Post Office. There is also an interurban railway station.

References

Commercial buildings on the National Register of Historic Places in Illinois
Italianate architecture in Illinois
Commercial architecture in Illinois
Queen Anne architecture in Illinois
Neoclassical architecture in Illinois
Renaissance Revival architecture in Illinois
Tudor Revival architecture in Illinois
Buildings and structures in Grundy County, Illinois
Historic districts on the National Register of Historic Places in Illinois
National Register of Historic Places in Grundy County, Illinois
2006 establishments in Illinois